Bridebridge is a village in County Cork, Ireland, just south of Castlelyons. The village is named for the stone bridge across the River Bride, at the south end of the village. The population was 187 at the 2016 census. The local soccer club is Castlebridge Celtic.

References

Towns and villages in County Cork